Hellbound: Hellraiser II is a 1988 supernatural horror film directed by Tony Randel and starring Clare Higgins, Ashley Laurence, Kenneth Cranham and Doug Bradley. The second film in the Hellraiser franchise, Hellraiser II draws heavily upon (and was made by much of the same cast and crew as) its precursor, Hellraiser, which was released a year before. Laurence reprises her role as Kirsty Cotton, who is admitted into a psychiatric hospital after the events of the first film. There, the head doctor (Cranham) unleashes the Cenobites, a group of sadomasochistic beings from another dimension.

Clive Barker, who wrote and directed the first Hellraiser film, wrote the story of Hellraiser II and served as executive producer. An international co-production of the United Kingdom and the United States, Hellraiser II screened at the Toronto Festival of Festivals on 9 September 1988, and received mixed reviews upon release. It grossed $12.1 million at the box office and was followed by Hellraiser III: Hell on Earth in 1992.

Plot
In the past, British military officer Elliot Spencer is transformed into the Cenobite "Pinhead" after opening the Lament Configuration.

Shortly after her father is killed by Frank Cotton, Kirsty Cotton is admitted into a psychiatric hospital. Interviewed by Doctor Channard, and his assistant Kyle MacRae, she tells her account of the events, and pleads with them to destroy the bloody mattress that her murderous stepmother, Julia Cotton, died on.

After hearing Kirsty's story, Dr. Channard, who is secretly obsessed with the Lament Configuration, has the mattress brought to his home and convinces a mentally ill patient, Mr. Browning, to lie on it and cut himself with a straight razor. The resulting blood frees a skinless Julia from the Cenobite dimension. MacRae, having snuck inside Channard's house to investigate Kirsty's claims, witnesses the event and flees.

Kirsty meets a young patient named Tiffany, who demonstrates an amazing aptitude for puzzles. Later that night, Kirsty is awakened in her room by a vision of who she believes is her skinless father, who tells her in writing that he's in Hell and asks her to help him. MacRae arrives back at the hospital and informs Kirsty he believes everything is true. The two decide to return to Channard's house.

Meanwhile, Channard, seduced by Julia, has brought more mentally ill patients to his home for her to feed on and regenerate. Kirsty and MacRae arrive at Channard's home. MacRae is killed by a now fully regenerated Julia, and Kirsty is knocked unconscious.

Channard and Julia kidnap Tiffany and force her to unlock the Lament Configuration so they can enter the labyrinth-like world of Pinhead and the Cenobites. The entity Leviathan, in the shape of a gigantic, elongated diamond, rotates in space above the labyrinth, shooting out black beams which make Channard remember some of the atrocities he committed. Julia calls Leviathan the "god of flesh, hunger, and desire...the Lord of the Labyrinth". Kirsty, who now possesses the Lament Configuration, follows them in.

Pinhead and the other Cenobites find Kirsty and tell her she is free to explore. Julia betrays Channard to Leviathan to be turned into a Cenobite; as Channard screams during the procedure, Julia reveals that she has a mission to bring souls to Leviathan, including Channard's.

Kirsty encounters Frank Cotton in the labyrinth, who reveals that he tricked her by pretending to be her father. Julia appears and destroys Frank in revenge for killing her, allowing Kirsty to escape. Julia is then killed by a vortex that opens within the labyrinth, leaving only her skin behind.

Kirsty and Tiffany reconnect and attempt to escape, but are ambushed by Channard, who has now become a Cenobite. The girls flee and encounter Pinhead and his Cenobites. Kirsty shows Pinhead a photograph of Spencer that she took from Channard's study, and he gradually remembers that he was human. Suddenly, Channard appears. Pinhead and the other Cenobites attempt to fight him, but Channard easily overpowers and kills them all; before being killed, Spencer exchanges a poignant glance with Kirsty.

Channard traps Kirsty and Tiffany. Kirsty finds Julia's skin and wears it to distract Channard, giving Tiffany enough time to once again solve the Lament Configuration. Channard is killed and the door to hell is finally closed. The girls leave the hospital.

Elsewhere, two moving men are removing Dr. Channard's belongings from his home. One is pulled inside of the mattress, and the other witnesses a mysterious pillar rise from within it. One of the faces fused to the pillar is the vagrant from the previous film, which asks the man, "What's your pleasure, sir?"

Cast
 Clare Higgins as Julia Cotton
 Ashley Laurence as Kirsty Cotton
 Kenneth Cranham as Dr. Phillip Channard / Channard Cenobite
 Imogen Boorman as Tiffany
 Doug Bradley as Pinhead / Captain Elliot Spencer
 Nicholas Vince as Chatterer / Chatterer II
 Simon Bamford as Butterball
 Barbie Wilde as Female Cenobite
 Sean Chapman as Frank Cotton
 Oliver Smith as Mr. Browning / Skinless Frank
 William Hope as Dr. Kyle MacRae
 Deborah Joel as Skinless Julia / Skinless Julia On Pillar
 Angus McInnes as Detective Ronson
 James Tillitt as Officer Cortez
 Bradley Lavelle as Officer Kucich 
 Catherine Chevalier as Tiffany's Mother
 Kevin Cole as Chatterer, Human Form

Production

Clive Barker returned as executive producer for the sequel. Tony Randel directed due to his experience of working with Barker on Hellraiser. Randel claims the dark tone of the movie reflected his own mindset on the world at the time. The picture was due to have a much larger budget but it decreased after financial issues with New World Pictures.

Nicholas Vince, who plays the Chatterer, received a hook to the jaw while filming a scene involving his character being impaled on a swinging torture rack surrounded by the many hanging chains. He also requested his character have eyes to help his vision, which caused some discontent with fans who derided the new design. A scene in which the character receives his "vision" was removed from the final cut, causing some confusion at his introductory scene in Hellbound featuring him in his original "eyeless" guise.

Originally, there was going to be an extra scene during the ending when Kirsty and Tiffany are running from Channard. The scene was planned so that during their escape the duo run into a doctor and nurse. The doctor demands to know what are they doing. Kirsty backs away in horror when suddenly the doctor and nurse turn into Pinhead and the Female Cenobite, before she and Tiffany continue running. The scene was filmed but was ultimately dropped from the final cut for two reasons. One was because the filmmakers thought that having actor Doug Bradley as a normal doctor would confuse the viewers, and another was because the special effects for the scene turned out poorly, so it was decided to discard it altogether. However, a photographer who was on set took some photos of Pinhead and the Female Cenobite dressed as surgeons which were used for promotion of the film, and were also used on some VHS/DVD covers of the movie, confusing fans and starting rumors about an "infamous deleted surgery scene". Some trailers do show a few shots from this unfinished scene, as well as parts of another deleted scene with Chatterer stopping the elevator with his hand and jumping at Kirsty and Tiffany. The lost scene was eventually rediscovered on a VHS workprint and announced as an extra for Arrow Video's Blu-ray reissue of the first three films in the series.

British Shakespearean actor Kenneth Cranham, who plays Channard, claimed his involvement was due to his grandson pestering him to take up the offer, being a fan of the original.

Oliver Smith, who played Skinless Frank in the original due to his skinny frame (allowing the body makeup to be realistic), reprised his role along with two extra roles as Browning (the mental patient with delusional parasitosis) and as the skinless figure Kirsty sees in the hospital who writes "I Am In Hell Help Me" in blood on the wall.

Composer Christopher Young also returned to compose a more bombastic score larger in scope. For the horn-like sound supposedly emanating from Leviathan in the center of Hell's labyrinth, he had the morse code for the word god incorporated.

Alternate screenplay
An alternate script with Kirsty's father Larry exists, written before Andrew Robinson declined to reprise the role. Many reasons were given for this including disagreement over fees and a clash of schedules although nothing has ever been confirmed. Dr. Channard was originally called Dr. Malahide but this was changed by the director. It was revealed in the documentary "Leviathan: The Story of Hellraiser and Hellbound: Hellraiser 2" from Andrew Robinson that he was not a fan of the script and decided to not return as his character was finished anyway. Writer Peter Atkins said that despite liking Robinson as an actor he was relieved that he declined as it made the narrative work a lot better in the finished project.

Release
Hellbound was initially rated X by the Motion Picture Association of America, which would have limited it to those 17 and older. Barker attributed this to preferring explicit displays of the grotesque rather than hinting at it.

Hellbound: Hellraiser II was shown at the Toronto Festival of Festivals on 9 September 1988. It was later shown in Los Angeles and New York on 23 December. During its theatrical release, Hellbound grossed $12,090,735 in the United States, and £980,503 in the United Kingdom.

Critical response
On the review aggregator website Rotten Tomatoes, Hellbound: Hellraiser II holds a 50% approval rating based on 30 critic reviews, with an average rating of 5.30/10. The consensus reads: "Hellbound: Hellraiser II retains the twisted visual thrill of its predecessor, although seams in the plot are already starting to show". 

Roger Ebert of the Chicago Sun-Times described it as "some kind of avant-garde film strip in which there is no beginning, no middle, no end, but simply a series of gruesome images that can be watched in any order". Caryn James of The New York Times wished for more plot and less "silly" effects: "Ogling strange creatures is the film's true reason for being". In a more positive review, Chris Willman of the Los Angeles Times called it "faster and campier" than its predecessor, "more of an action/adventure picture this time around, if still an exceptionally grisly one". Retrospective reviews have called it the best sequel in the franchise.

Sequel

References

External links

 
 
 
 
 

Hellraiser films
1988 horror films
1988 films
British supernatural horror films
American supernatural horror films
American dark fantasy films
Films based on works by Clive Barker
Films scored by Christopher Young
Films directed by Tony Randel
Films set in hell
Films set in psychiatric hospitals
Incest in film
Religious horror films
Films shot at Pinewood Studios
New World Pictures films
Mad scientist films
1980s English-language films
1980s American films
1980s British films